Valerie Niehaus (born 11 October 1974) is a German actress.

Early life 
Valerie Niehaus grew up in Emsdetten where she went to the local primary school. After that she moved to Fulda and later to Berlin.

Career 
At the age of thirteen Niehaus made her first television appearance in the television series Rote Erde. She came to public prominence starring as Julia von Anstetten in Verbotene Liebe. In 1995 and 1996 Niehaus won the bronze Bravo Otto as female TV star. When she left Verbotene Liebe in 1997 Niehaus went to New York City to study acting at the Lee Strasberg Theatre Institute. She graduated in 1999. In 1998 Niehaus appeared in the movie . 

In 2000 followed the movie . In 2001 she appeared in the TV film Love Crash. In 2002 she played Antonia Lenz in the comedy Der Duft des Geldes. In 2003 she portrayed Irina Burger in Das bisschen Haushalt. In 2006 Niehaus played the title role in the television series Alles über Anna. In 2009 Niehaus played the horse breeder Katherina Mohr in Tierisch Verliebt. 

In 2010 she starred as the single mother Maja Nielsen in the TV movie Sind denn alle Männer Schweine?. In the 2013 TV movie The Beautiful Spy Niehaus played the agent Vera von Schalburg who worked for the German defense at the beginning of World War II. In 2014 Valerie Niehaus played Lila in the comedy . In the same year she appeared next to Uwe Ochsenknecht in the film Überleben an der Scheidungsfront.

Since 2018, she has worked as a correspondent on the heute show, a satirical news program shown on the German television channel ZDF.

Personal life 
Valerie Niehaus is a single mother. She lives in Berlin together with her son Joshua Elias. The German actress Ruth Niehaus is Niehaus's grandaunt.

Filmography

References

External links

 

1974 births
Living people
German film actresses
German television actresses
20th-century German actresses
21st-century German actresses
People from Emsdetten